Elise Barney (1810–1883) was a postmistress in Brisbane, Queensland, Australia, in 1855–1864. She was the first postmistress in Queensland.

References 

People from Queensland
Public servants of Queensland
1810 births
1883 deaths
19th-century Australian people
19th-century Australian women